Magdalenka  is a village in the administrative district of Gmina Lesznowola, within Piaseczno County, Masovian Voivodeship, in east-central Poland.

The village has a population of 2000.

It was also the site of a bloody conflict between Polish Special Forces, BOA, and two heavily armed mafia combatants in 2003. It resulted in two police officers being killed and seventeen wounded. The mafia combatants used homemade mines and explosives, while they also had at least twenty eight weapons - from handguns to rifles.

References

Magdalenka